Gulshan Grover (born 21 September 1955) is an Indian actor and producer who has appeared in over 100 films. He is popularly known as the "Bad Man" of Bollywood because of his ability to create an impact with his negative roles in films.

Early life 
Grover holds a post graduate degree from Delhi's Sri Ram College of Commerce and was associated with ‘Little Theatre Group’ for a long time before launching into the Hindi film industry.

Awards

Selected filmography

Music videos

See also

List of Indian film actors

References

Additional references
 Gulshan Grover wins best actor at NY fest
 Gulshan Grover wins best actor at NY fest
 'Desperate Endeavours' has him playing a spiritual leader
 Going for Bond
 Cartoon Character Based on Gulshan Grover
 Gulshan grover awarded
 Gulshan Grover and Salma Kayak in the movie The Driver
 Gulshan Grover wins best actor award in New York
 Gulshan Grover treasures JP Dutta compliment

External links

 

Indian male film actors
Living people
Punjabi people
Male actors in Hindi cinema
Shri Ram College of Commerce alumni
20th-century Indian male actors
21st-century Indian male actors
Male actors from New Delhi
1955 births